Longobardi is a surname. Notable people with the surname include:

Cristian Longobardi, an Italian football player
Joseph J. Longobardi, an American federal judge
Longobardi people, an Italian name for the Lombards, a Germanic people
Marcelo Longobardi, Argentine journalist
Nino Longobardi, Italian artist

See also 

 Longobardi (disambiguation)
 Longobardo

Italian-language surnames